The Fort Sumner Cemetery Wall and Entry, at 17th and Dunn Sts, 1 mile north of intersection of 17th and U.S. 60 in Fort Sumner, New Mexico, was a Works Progress Administration project in 1938 and 1939.  It was listed on the National Register of Historic Places in 2008.

References

		
National Register of Historic Places in De Baca County, New Mexico
Buildings and structures completed in 1938